William Hepburn Cozens-Hardy, 2nd Baron Cozens-Hardy, KC (25 March 1869 – 25 May 1924) was a British Liberal politician and lawyer.

Family
Cozens-Hardy was the eldest son of Herbert Cozens-Hardy, 1st Baron Cozens-Hardy and Maria Hepburn. Herbert Cozens-Hardy was a lawyer and Liberal Member of Parliament for North Norfolk from 1885 to 1899. He was then appointed a judge and eventually became Master of the Rolls. The Barony was created in 1914 and William succeeded as 2nd Baron on the death of his father in 1920. In 1895, he married Gertrude Lilian the eldest daughter of Colonel Sir William Everett KCMG. They had one daughter.

Education
William was educated at University College School in Hampstead where he was leader of the school debating society and Captain of School. He then went up to New College, Oxford where he took his degree with classical honours.

Career
Like his father, William went into the law. He was called to the Bar at Lincoln's Inn in 1893 and took silk in 1912. He was made a Bencher of Lincoln's Inn in 1916. He also sat as a Justice of the Peace in Norfolk.  In 1913 he was offered the post of Chief Justice of Bengal but refused for private reasons. Throughout the four years of the First World War, he was a Commander in the Royal Naval Volunteer Reserve, serving on the Admiralty War Staff, attached to the Intelligence Department. He was awarded the Italian Order of St Maurice and St Lazarus. He was knighted in 1912.

Politics
Cozens-Hardy also followed his father in his political affiliation. While at Oxford University he was involved in Liberal politics, being a member of the Russell Club and he was President of the Union. He was elected as Liberal MP for South Norfolk at the 1918 general election. Although he stood as a Coalition Liberal at that election he did not receive the Coalition coupon. One source indicates this was because he was late entering the field. He then chose to take the Coalition whip in Parliament. William's political stance in the election has been described as a "...conventional Coalition programme: support for Lloyd George and harsh peace with Germany, jobs and houses for the returning soldiers all topped off with expressions of concern about agriculture and repeated references to his own Norfolk roots."
When William succeeded his father to the peerage he had to stand down from the House of Commons and in the by-election of 27 July 1920 which followed, his seat was won by George Edwards, the Labour candidate with the Liberal vote split between Lloyd George Coalition Liberal and Asquithian Independent Liberal candidates.

Death
Cozens-Hardy was a pioneer of motoring. In the early days of his marriage he and his wife would undertake long and hazardous trips around continental Europe. This love of cars was the cause of his death as he was killed in a motor accident at Bucchof, Starnberg in Bavaria on 25 May 1924 aged 55. As he had no male heir, the title passed to his younger brother, Edward Herbert Cozens-Hardy (1873–1956).

Arms

References

Who was Who, OUP 2007

External links 
 

1869 births
1924 deaths
Barons in the Peerage of the United Kingdom
People from Letheringsett with Glandford
Liberal Party (UK) MPs for English constituencies
UK MPs 1918–1922
UK MPs who inherited peerages
People educated at University College School
Royal Naval Volunteer Reserve personnel of World War I
Alumni of New College, Oxford
Members of Lincoln's Inn
Presidents of the Oxford Union
English King's Counsel
Royal Navy officers of World War I
Royal Navy officers